ROSE is a producer of bicycles and equipment from Germany.

History
At the beginning of the 20th century, in the year 1907, Heinrich Rose founded the first bicycle shop in the Westphalian city of Bocholt. In 1932, Heinrich Rose, Jr., took over the management and opened a bicycle shop in the city, consisting of 30 square metres. To get affluent clientele the shop applied the slogan “The price is cheapest in the smallest shop.” During winter most of ROSEs business consisted of selling Dürkopp sewing machines. In 1970, Heinrich’s sons Erwin und Walter took over the management of ROSE.

In 1982, the first printed catalogue was published in black and white with 64 pages and a print run of 4,000 copies. In the 1990s, ROSE’s mail order business grew and the company moved into its new premises at Schersweide 4, which offered 3,800m² of space for storage, commissioning and the shipping of parcels, for bike assembly, administration and catalogue production. The mail order business employed 55 staff, while a further 20 staff worked in the shop.
After 2000 ROSE opened the “biketown” in Bocholt with over 6,000 m² and set a new benchmark.

Today ROSE Bikes has 227 employees and a turnover of 60 million euros. Since 2014 there is also a “BIKETOWN” with 300 square metres in Munich, which was honored with the “Stores of the year Award” by the German trade union.

Sponsoring 
ROSE sponsors the following riders and teams:
 Team Stölting Service Group
 ROSE Vaujany ultraSPORTS
 LKT-Team-Brandenburg
 Team Roseversand Bocholter WSV
 Roseteam Münsterland
 Roseteam NRW
 Rose Factory Racing Team (Mountain bike)
 Rad-net Rose Team (Continental Team)
 Bobby Root and Jakub Vencl (Freerider)
 Mareen Hufe (Triathlete)
 Laura Lindemann (Triathlete) 
 Marcel Kittel (retired professional cyclist)

References

External links
 
 Bike-Channel
 Rose Bikes via Biketoday
 Rose Bikes stops selling  bikes in the UK

German brands
Companies based in North Rhine-Westphalia
Retail companies established in 1907
Cycle manufacturers of Germany
German companies established in 1907
Vehicle manufacturing companies established in 1907
Mountain bike manufacturers